is a 2019 Japanese superhero film in the Movie War line of the Kamen Rider Series. It serves as a crossover between the television series Kamen Rider Zero-One and Kamen Rider Zi-O and is the fourth film of the Generations series. The film also pays tribute to Kamen Rider Zero-One, the original Kamen Rider series and  the entire Heisei Kamen Rider series as a whole. It also introduces Gai Amatsu as Kamen Rider Thouser.

Plot
The Hiden Zero-One Driver can only be used by the company's president. Whose will was the one that led to the creation of this device and it falling in the hands of Aruto Hiden? Zero-One's birth story will be revealed!

Kamen Rider Zi-O, who fought as the greatest Demon King of Heisei Kamen Riders chose to reset the world and live a new life. Why does Sougo Tokiwa transform into a Kamen Rider again and meet Zero-One? Kamen Rider Zi-O's true ending chosen by Sougo will be revealed!

The world of Zero-One and the world of Zi-O. The two heroes live in different worlds, but what is waiting for them after crossing time and space into a single world? Union or conflict? This winter marks a new legend in the history of Kamen Rider.

Cast

Zero-One cast
: 
: 
: 
: 
: 
: 
: 
: 
: 
: 
Young Aruto: 
: 
: 
: 

Zi-O cast
: 
: 
: 
: 

Reiwa The First Generation cast
: 
: :
Teacher Humagear: 
Student Humagear: 
Nurse Humagear: 

Voiceover roles
: 
:

Theme song
""Another Daybreak" 01 Movie Edition"
Lyrics: Takanori Nishikawa+Yuyoyuppe
Composition: J
Arrangement: J×Takanori Nishikawa and DJ'Tekina//Something
Artist: J×Takanori Nishikawa

Reception

Kamen Rider Reiwa The First Generation grossed $7,529,337 at the box office.

References

External links

Films scored by Toshihiko Sahashi
2010s Kamen Rider films